Galina Dmitriyevna Bob (born 4 November 1984) is a Russian actress and singer. She is best known for her role of Maria "Bobylych" Bobylkina in the comedy television series Deffchonki, which she portrayed from 2012 to 2018.

Personal life
Since September 26, 2014, Bob has been married to director Sergey Koryagin, whom she met three years before the wedding. The couple have two sons, Leo (born 20 March 2015) and Andrei (born 25 April 2017) and daughter Margarita (15 April 2021).

References

1984 births
Living people
People from Penza
Russian film actresses
Russian stage actresses
Russian television actresses
Russian pop singers
21st-century Russian actresses
21st-century Russian women singers
21st-century Russian singers
Gerasimov Institute of Cinematography alumni